Justice Reed refers to Stanley Forman Reed, associate justice of the U.S. Supreme Court. Justice Reed may also refer to:

William Reed (Massachusetts judge) (fl. 1770s), judge who declined appointment to the Massachusetts Supreme Judicial Court
Joseph Reed (politician) (1741–1785), associate justice of the Supreme Court of Pennsylvania
Joseph Rea Reed (1835–1925), associate justice of the Iowa Supreme Court
Lazarus H. Reed (c. 1815–1855), associate justice of the Utah Supreme Court
Nathaniel C. Reed (c. 1810–1853), associate justice of the Ohio Supreme Court
Scott Elgin Reed (1921–1994), associate justice of the Kentucky Supreme Court

See also
Judge Reed (disambiguation)
Justice Read (disambiguation)
Justice Reid (disambiguation)